The London Troops War Memorial, located in front of the Royal Exchange in the City of London, commemorates the men of London who fought in World War I and World War II.

Description
On each of the buttress plinths, to the north and south of the central column, is a life-size bronze statue of a soldier standing at ease with a rifle, one representing the Royal Fusiliers and the other the Royal Field Artillery. The column is surmounted by a bronze lion rampant bearing a medallion of Saint George and the Dragon, with the legand "St George for England".

The west side of the central column bears a carving of the coat of arms of the City of London, above dedicatory inscriptions.  The east side bears the arms of the County of London above a list of the London regiments that were engaged in the First and Second World Wars: the Royal Fusiliers (City of London) Regiment, the Honourable Artillery Company, four units of the City of London Yeomanry and County of London Yeomanry, eight London brigades of the Royal Field Artillery and two batteries of the Royal Garrison Artillery, units of the Royal Engineers, 28 battalions of the London Regiment (1st to 25th, 28th, 33rd and 34th), and London units of the Royal Army Service Corps, Royal Army Medical Corps, Royal Army Veterinary Corps, Territorial Force Nursing Service, and Voluntary Aid Detachments. Most served with the 56th (1st London) Division, 47th (2nd London) Division, or 58th (London) Division, mainly on the Western Front, or with the 60th (London) Division on the Western Front and then in Salonika and Egypt.  Behind the bronze soldiers, the north and south sides of the stone column each bear carvings of three flags, with each flagpole topped by a crown and a wreath.

Construction
The sculptor of the bronze figures was Alfred Drury, with the bronzes cast at the Albion Art Foundry. The stone-carver and letterer was William Silver Frith, and the architect was Sir Aston Webb, who was President of the Royal Academy from 1919 to 1925. The budgeted £7,000 for the memorial was raised by public subscription.

To create space for the memorial in front of the Royal Exchange, a drinking fountain was moved to Cornhill, where it replaced a statue of Sir Rowland Hill, which was moved to St Martin's le Grand,

Unveiling
The memorial was unveiled in front of a large crowd on a foggy day, 12 November 1920, the day after the ceremony to bury the Unknown Warrior at Westminster Abbey.   Prince Arthur, Duke of Connaught and Strathearn was scheduled to unveil the memorial, but he was indisposed and was represented by Prince Albert, Duke of York.  A guard of honour and military band came from the 3rd Battalion Grenadier Guards, with a march-past of detachments from London military units.

For some year after the memorial was unveiled, the clerks at the Bank of England nearby took upon themselves the task of maintaining the floral tributes left at the memorial.  Copper replicas of the memorial were presented to the London units represented on the memorial in 1923.

It became a Grade II listed building in June 1972, upgraded to Grade II* in June 2016 for the centenary of the Battle of the Somme.

Inscriptions

A brass plaque reads: "Raised by public subscription at the Mansion House in the peace year 1919 during the mayoralty of Col. The Rt. Hon., Sir Horace Brooks Marshall, K.C.V.O., LL.D."  The brass plaque was added after 1945, replacing original wording that was removed from the column when a further dedication was added after the Second World War.

Details

See also
 1920 in art
 List of public art in the City of London
 Grade II* listed war memorials in England

References

External links

 Monument: London Troops War Memorial at London Remembers

1920 establishments in the United Kingdom
1920 sculptures
Bronze sculptures in the United Kingdom
Grade II* listed buildings in the City of London
Grade II* listed monuments and memorials
Military memorials in London
Outdoor sculptures in London
Statues in London
World War I memorials in England
World War II memorials in England